Charles Tillinghast could refer to: 

Charles Foster Tillinghast (1797–1864), American lawyer and grandfather of Charles Foster Tillinghast Sr.
Charles Foster Tillinghast Sr. (1871-1948), American businessman and National Guard officer
Charles Foster Tillinghast Jr. (1913-1995), American yachtsman and naval officer, son of Charles Foster Tillinghast Sr.
Charles C. Tillinghast Jr. (1911-1998), American businessman

See also
Charles Tillinghast House, historic house in Newport, Rhode Island
Charles Tillinghast James (1805-1857), American manufacturing engineer